Archbishop of Durrës may refere to:

 Eastern Orthodox Archbishop of Durrës, historical title of  senior prelates of the Albanian Orthodox Church
 Roman Catholic Archbishop of Durrës, historical title of Roman Catholic Archbishops of Tirana-Durrës

See also
 Durrës (disambiguation)